Statistics of Swiss National League A in the 1985–86 football season.

Overview
It was contested by 16 teams, and BSC Young Boys won the championship.

League standings

Results

References

Sources
 Switzerland 1985–86 at RSSSF

Swiss Football League seasons
Swiss
1985–86 in Swiss football